The Mannheim Tornados are a baseball and softball club from Mannheim, Baden-Württemberg.  Founded in 1975, it is the oldest continuing baseball club in Germany. The first men's team plays in the first division of the Baseball Bundesliga and has won 11 championships, the most of any club to reach the top tier of German baseball.  The team won every championship between 1984 and 1989. However, the Tornados have not won a championship since 1997, though they perennially make the playoffs.

Club Structure
The full club consists of 12 teams:
1st Men's, plays in Bundesliga's 1st Division
Men's Regional
Association Men's League
1st Women's
Association Women's League
Juniors (16–18 years)
Youth (13–15 years)
Student (9–12 years)
Junior Women (17–19 years)
T-Ball (4–8 years)
2 recreational teams (Slow Pitch)
Mixed Team League Softball Fast Pitch

Each member pays an annual club fee, ranging from €55 for ordinary members to €170 for active adult members. The club also set up a separate organization, The Friends of the Baseball Club Tornados Mannheim eV.  It is classified as a charitable organization by the City of Mannheim, and has an annual membership fee of €24.

Season by Season Performance (1st Bundesliga)

Retired Numbers
The team has five retired numbers:
30 - Frank Jäger, played 390 games with the Tornados from 1984 to 2000, batting .314 lifetime
22 - Bernard Pickett, known as "Yogi," played 213 games with the Tornados and batted .413 lifetime
20 - Stephan Jäger, hit .425 for the Tornados over 194 games
35 - Eddy Polanco, hit .413 over 221 games for the Tornados
44 - Klaus Knüttel, played 498 games in his Tornados jersey, pitched 1121 strikeouts in 1129 innings.  Also a power hitter, he had 97 home runs, 20 triples, and 9 doubles during his career.

References

External links
 Official Site
 Roberto Clemente Field

Baseball teams in Germany